Princeville Airport  is a private airport located  east of the central business district (CBD) of Hanalei, a village on the island of Kaua‘i in Hawaii, United States.

History 
Princeville Airport opened for operations in 1977. Shortly thereafter Princeville Airways began scheduled services on September 9, 1980, between Honolulu and Princeville, Kauai using two de Havilland Canada DHC-6 Twin Otter STOL capable turboprop aircraft. It served this initial regular commuter route between Princeville and Honolulu primarily for Princeville Resort guests.

The State of Hawaii in 1994 entered into an agreement with the owners of the airport to take over operations and management. In 1996 the Session Laws of Hawaii created Act 287 to appropriate $100,000 for a design to widen Runway 5-23. The State dropped the airport lease in 1999.

On May 1, 2019, Makani Kai Air began twice daily service between Honolulu International Airport and Princeville Airport on Kauai. The airport had been without commercial airline service for more than 20 years after the departure of Island Air in 1997. Since the merger with Mokulele Airlines, commercial flights from Princeville are no longer offered.

Previous airline service 

 Island Air (Honolulu)
 Makani Kai Air (Honolulu)

References

External links 

Airports in Hawaii
Transportation in Kauai County, Hawaii
Buildings and structures in Kauai County, Hawaii
Airports established in 1977
1977 establishments in Hawaii